The Federal Office of Bundeswehr Equipment, Information Technology and In-Service Support (Bundesamt für Ausrüstung, Informationstechnik und Nutzung der Bundeswehr; BAAINBw) is a German government agency for equipping the German armed forces  (Bundeswehr) with modern weapon systems considering cost efficiency aspects. In doing so, it is responsible for developing, assessing and procuring weapon systems.

It was founded in 2012 by merging the Bundesamt für Wehrtechnik und Beschaffung (BWB) and Bundesamt für Informationsmanagement und Informationstechnik (IT-AmtBw) with the goal of producing synergies. The Bundeswehr Technical and Airworthiness Center for Aircraft is branch of the agency.

The BAAINBw is located in Koblenz, Rhineland-Palatinate and directly reports to the Federal Ministry of Defence (Germany) located in Bonn and Berlin.

References

External links
 Website of BAAINBw 
 BAAINBw Structure 

Bundeswehr
Military acquisition
Military planning